Sir Charles Alphonse Pantaléon Pelletier,  (January 22, 1837 – April 29, 1911) was a Canadian lawyer, militia officer, politician, publisher, judge, and the ninth Lieutenant Governor of Quebec.

Biography 
Born in Rivière-Ouelle, Lower Canada (now Quebec), the son of Jean-Marie Pelletier and Julie Painchaud, he studied law at the Université Laval, was called to the bar in 1860 and entered practice in Quebec City. He married Suzanne, the daughter of lawyer Charles-Eusèbe Casgrain in 1861; his wife died during childbirth the following year. In 1862, he joined the Canadian Militia as an officer with the Voltigeurs de Québec. A Captain by 1863, he became a major with the 9th Battalion Volunteer Militia Rifles and saw active service with the battalion in 1866 during the Fenian Raids and retired from the militia in 1867. In 1866, he married Eugénie, the daughter of Marc-Pascal de Sales Laterrière, a doctor and seigneur. He was elected as a Liberal to the House of Commons of Canada representing the riding of Kamouraska, Quebec in a by-election held in 1869. There was no election in this riding in 1867 due to riots. He was re-elected in 1872 and 1874. He was also elected to represent Québec-Est in the Legislative Assembly of Quebec in an 1873 by-election; he resigned this seat in 1874 when the dual mandate became illegal. From 1877 to 1878, he was the Minister of Agriculture in the federal cabinet.

He was President of the Canadian Commission for the Paris World Fair in 1878. He was made a Companion of the Order of St Michael and St George for his work on this commission. In 1898, he was promoted to Knight Commander.

In 1877, he was appointed to the Senate of Canada representing the senatorial division of Grandville, Quebec. From 1896 to 1901, he was the Speaker of the Senate of Canada. He resigned in 1904 and was appointed a puisne judge of the Quebec Superior Court.

In 1908, he was appointed Lieutenant Governor of Quebec and served until his death in 1911.

References
 
 
 Biography from the Ministry of Agriculture
 

1837 births
1911 deaths
Judges in Quebec
Lawyers in Quebec
Canadian Militia officers
Les Voltigeurs de Québec
Les Voltigeurs de Québec officers
Quebec Liberal Party MNAs
Canadian Knights Commander of the Order of St Michael and St George
Liberal Party of Canada MPs
Lieutenant Governors of Quebec
Members of the House of Commons of Canada from Quebec
Members of the King's Privy Council for Canada
Speakers of the Senate of Canada
Canadian senators from Quebec
Université Laval alumni
Beaubien-Casgrain family